Hans Niessl (in official documents, his surname is spelt Nießl, born 12 June 1951 in Zurndorf) is an Austrian politician, member of the Social Democratic Party of Austria and former Governor of Burgenland.

From 1987 till 2000, Niessl was mayor of Frauenkirchen, he has been a member of the parliament of Burgenland since 1996.

External links 
  

1951 births
Living people
People from Neusiedl am See District
Social Democratic Party of Austria politicians
Governors of Burgenland